Dolichothele is a genus of spiders in the family Theraphosidae found in Brazil and Bolivia. It was first described in 1923 by Mello-Leitão.

Diagnosis 
It owns a labium, which has less than 10 cuspules, also owning undivided tarsal scopula on legs 1 through 3, leg 4 being undivided with a band of hairs. The tarsal claws of males also lack teeth, and the spermathecae owning multiple lobules.

Species
, the World Spider Catalog accepted the following 10 species:
Dolichothele auratum (Vellard, 1924) – Brazil
Dolichothele bolivianum (Vol, 2001) – Bolivia, Brazil
Dolichothele camargorum Revollo, Silva & Bertani, 2017 - Bolivia, Brazil
Dolichothele diamantinensis (Bertani, Santos & Righi, 2009) – Brazil
Dolichothele dominguense (Guadanucci, 2007) – Brazil
Dolichothele exilis Mello-Leitão, 1923 – Brazil
Dolichothele mineirum (Guadanucci, 2011) – Brazil
Dolichothele mottai Revollo, Silva & Bertani, 2017 - Brazil
Dolichothele rufoniger (Guadanucci, 2007) – Brazil
Dolichothele tucuruiense (Guadanucci, 2007) – Brazil

In synonymy 

 Dolichothele caatinga (Guadanucci, 2007) = Dolichothele exilis 
 Dolichothele muticum (Mello-Leitão, 1923) = Dolichothele exilis
 Dolichothele nigrioculatum (Bücherl, Timotheo & Lucas, 1971) = Dolichothele exilis

Nomen dubium 

 Dolichothele mimeticum (Mello-Leitão & Arlé, 1934) - Brazil

References

Theraphosidae
Theraphosidae genera
Spiders of South America